Soviet Koreans may refer to:
Koryo-saram, the descendants of 19th-century Korean immigrants to the Russian Far East
Sakhalin Koreans, Korean subjects of the Japanese Empire who remained in the Soviet Union after World War II
The ethnic Koreans born in Russia who were a  faction of the Workers' Party of North Korea